Cry of the Wild is a 1972 feature-length documentary film by Bill Mason and his second of three films about wolves. The film is a personal account of the two years Mason spent shooting his first film on wolves, Death of a Legend, incorporating footage from the earlier film. Cry of the Wild was shot in the Northwest Territories, British Columbia and Canadian Arctic, as well as near Mason's home in the Gatineau Hills, where he kept and observed three grown wolves and, eventually, a litter of cubs.

Release
Produced by the National Film Board of Canada (NFB) for $74,871, Cry of the Wild was launched in over 500 theatres in the United States, grossed over one million dollars in its opening week, generating a reported $4.5 million to $5+ million in gross box office.

The feature documentary was initially planned to be released in Canada on a small scale. At a showing in Edmonton, the NFB was approached by an American distributor interested in releasing it in the USA. The company bought the North American rights and released it in New York City, renting out theatres and showing the film on a continuous basis in a formula known as "four-walling." In this way, Cry of the Wild grossed $1.8 million in New York City alone. The film was released subsequently all over the U.S. and throughout Canada.

However, the release was not without problems. According to Gary Evans in his book In the National Interest: A Chronicle of the National Film Board of Canada from 1949 to 1989, the NFB only recouped several hundred thousand dollars because of a contract that allowed the American distributor to pocket the bulk of the proceeds and declare bankruptcy. Mason completed his third and final film on wolves, Wolf Pack, in 1974.

References

External links
Watch Cry of the Wild at NFB.ca

1972 films
Films directed by Bill Mason
Documentary films about nature
National Film Board of Canada documentaries
Films about wolves
Canadian sequel films
Films shot in British Columbia
1972 documentary films
Films shot in the Northwest Territories
1970s English-language films
1970s Canadian films